Petropavlovka is a rural locality (a selo) in Chernigovsky Selsoviet of Arkharinsky District, Amur Oblast, Russia. The population was 1 as of 2018. There is 1 street.

Geography 
Petropavlovka is located 34 km northwest of Arkhara (the district's administrative centre) by road.

References 

Rural localities in Arkharinsky District